The University Maternity Hospital, Limerick is a hospital in County Limerick, Ireland. It is managed by UL Hospitals Group.

History
The hospital on Ennis Road, which was designed by Patrick Sheahan, was opened by the Minister of Health, Seán MacEntee, as St Munchin's Regional Maternity Hospital in October 1960. It became the Mid-Western Regional Maternity Hospital in 2006.

Following the establishment of the Graduate Medical School at the University of Limerick, it became the University Maternity Hospital Limerick in 2013 when the hospitals in the greater Mid-West Region became part of a single operating and governance structure known as the UL Hospitals Group.

In 2013 it was listed in the Protection of Life During Pregnancy Bill 2013, subsequently enacted as the Protection of Life During Pregnancy Act 2013, as one of the institutions where abortions are authorized to be carried out under the Act.

In 2018 it was announced that the hospital would move to Dooradoyle to be co-located with the University Hospital Limerick.

References 

Hospitals in County Limerick
Maternity hospitals
Buildings and structures in Limerick (city)
Health Service Executive hospitals
1960 establishments in Ireland
Hospitals established in 1960
Hospital buildings completed in 1960
Maternity in Ireland
20th-century architecture in the Republic of Ireland